"Hard to Forget" is a song recorded by American country music singer Sam Hunt. It is the fourth single from his second studio album Southside. Hunt wrote the song with Ashley Gorley, Josh Osborne, Luke Laird, and Shane McAnally. The song contains a sample of Webb Pierce's 1953 hit "There Stands the Glass", whose writers Russ Hull, Audrey Grisham, and Mary Jean Shurtz are also credited.

Content
The song's concept began when Luke Laird presented Hunt with the idea of sampling older country music songs, something which Laird had done in his spare time but had never publicly released. Laird then heard "There Stands the Glass" and presented the idea to Hunt. The two had attempted to fit the sample to a song they were working on titled "One Whiskey Away", but had no success. The two then presented the idea to Shane McAnally and Josh Osborne, who were working with Hunt on a song titled "Hard to Forget". All of the writers then took the partially-formed ideas from "One Whiskey Away" and "Hard to Forget", and worked to incorporate new lyrics around the sample. Laird then assembled a demo which was given to Hunt's producer Zach Crowell. Crowell adjusted the tempo of the song and added instrumentation from session musicians such as Ilya Toshinsky and Jenee Fleenor. The final recording also features vocal ad-libs from Hunt's road band, as well as Gorley's daughter and her friends.

Wendy Hermanson and Billy Dukes of Taste of Country wrote of the song that "the overall result isn't 100 percent a traditional country song. Rather, it's a brilliant meld of old-school country with a distinctly modern, multi-groove tone." She also noted a "rollicking pop, almost reggae vibe". Webb Pierce's son, Webb Pierce Jr., praised the song for bringing his father's music to a younger audience.

Chart performance

Weekly charts

Year-end charts

Certifications

References

2020 songs
2020 singles
Sam Hunt songs
MCA Records singles
Songs written by Sam Hunt
Songs written by Luke Laird
Songs written by Shane McAnally
Songs written by Josh Osborne
Songs written by Ashley Gorley